Claire Wright may refer to:
 Claire Wright (gymnast) (born 1979), British trampoline gymnast
 Claire Wright (politician), independent candidate in the 2019 United Kingdom General Election
 Claire Wright (water polo) (born 1994), Canadian water polo player

See also
 Clare Wright (born 1969), American Australian historian, author and broadcaster